Know Hope is the third studio album by American metalcore band The Color Morale. It was released on March 20, 2013 through Rise Records and was produced by Josh Schroeder, Ramon Mendoza, Joshua Moore and the band themselves. It is the last album to be released on this label.

Background and recording
By mid-2012, the band was in the process of writing their third album, believed to be entitled Know Hope, and originally expecting a 2012 or 2013 release. The band wrote twenty-two songs, twelve of which were finalized into the album. Josh Schroeder produced, engineered, mixed, and mastered the record from October to December 2012.

Critical reception

The album received mostly positive reviews, but also mixed reviews from several critics. At Metacritic, which assigns a normalised rating out of 100 to reviews from mainstream critics, the album has an average score of 67 out of 100 based on 6 reviews, indicating "generally favorable reviews". AllMusic gave the album a positive review saying, "On their third effort, Rockford, Illinois metalcore group the Color Morale continue to rip out blistering metal, alternating between screaming verses and melodic choruses, but their abilities on both sides of the spectrum are better than ever. Like on We All Have Demons and My Devil in Your Eyes, there is an incredible level of intensity throughout Know Hope. Punishing breakdowns and post-prog guitar riffs punctuate the screamo moments, but Garret Rapp's ability to work in a big, clean, anthemic hook is the X factor that separates the five-piece from the sea of hardcore/emo sound-alikes."

Zach Redrup from Dead Press! rated the album positively calling it: "Back to the original question: why is the newer wave of "tumblr-core" bands more popular? Well, mostly because they're more interesting. Whether you hate them for it or not, other bands do this same style but with a catch or an element that The Color Morale are missing, and because of this they may continue to fall under the radar." New Transcendence gave the album almost a perfect score 9.1/10 and saying: "Know Hope is The Color Morale's third full length album, and released on March the twenty-sixth through Rise Records. There is so much more I could say about this album – so much I could just spend forever talking about, but I don't want to take away from the time you could be spending listening to it!  You can pick this album up at Hot Topic, on iTunes or on the band's merch site – grab it and get down with this sick piece of art!"

Lisa Fox of Rock Sins rated the album 9 out of 10 and said: "The bottom line is that The Color Morale play diverse, competent metalcore music. We're just sorry it took till album three for us to hear about them. Although it has to be said, Know Hope is a triumph. The Color Morale are what this generation needs; they are the quintessential heirs to the throne recently vacated by Alexisonfire. Listen to them and you'll be able to say 'I knew them before they hit the big time' because it won't be long."

Track listing

Personnel
Credits adapted from AllMusic.

The Color Morale
 Garret Rapp – lead vocals, keyboards
 Devin King – lead guitar
 Aaron Saunders – rhythm guitar, backing vocals
 Justin Hieser – bass, vocals
 Steve Carey – drums

Additional musicians
 Kailey Saunders – guest vocals on track 3, "Learned Behavior"

Additional personnel
 Josh Schroeder – engineering, mixing, mastering, production
 The Color Morale – production
 Ramon Mendoza – production
 Joshua Moore – production
 Matthew Stewart – management
 Mike Cubillos – publicity
 Jeremy Holgerson and Bryan Vastano – booking
 Travis Smith – cover art
 Aaron Marsh – layout design

Charts

References

2013 albums
The Color Morale albums
Rise Records albums